Danger Rangers is an American animated television series that aired on PBS Kids and Cookie Jar TV from September 5, 2005 to December 26, 2006.

Plot
The Danger Rangers are a team of anthropomorphic heroes who teach children about safety through examples, such as environmental hazards and unsafe places.

Characters
 Sully (voiced by Jerry Houser) – A blue sea lion. He is the leader and spokesanimal of the Danger Rangers. He cares a lot about his appearance, but also takes his duties as leader seriously.
 Kitty (voiced by Grey DeLisle) – A pink cat. She is the intelligent, cool and adventurous second-in-command of the group. She is also helpful and resourceful, and strongly believes in playing fair.
 Burble (voiced by Kevin Michael Richardson) – A large polar bear. He is the strong and humorous recreational safety expert. He is also the group's "gentle giant" and prefers to play both fair and safe.
 Squeeky (voiced by Rob Paulsen) – A navy blue mouse. He is small, yet very valuable to the Danger Rangers. With his size, he can fix any problem which otherwise proves to be too small for the others to handle.
 Burt (voiced by Mark Hamill) – A green turtle. He is the team's creative and genuine personal safety expert. As the team's inventor, Burt always comes up with inventions, including Fallbot, that would help the Danger Rangers in their missions.
 Gabriela "GB" (voiced by Tasia Valenza) – A red hummingbird. She is the operations chief and head safety trainer. While the other members go out on the field during a mission, she usually acts as a supervisor.  
 Fallbot (voiced by John Kassir) – A blue-and-yellow robot who was invented by Burt. He is the very clumsy and accident-prone ally of the Danger Rangers.
 SAVO (voiced by Charlie Adler) – The artificial intelligence of the Danger Rangers' base who alerts them of any safety trouble. His name is an acronym, as it stands for "Safety Alert Vectometer" (as shown in "Mission 547: Safety Rules"). He also somewhat has a flair for the dramatic.
 Junior Danger Rangers – Various children who help and work along with the Danger Rangers.

Cast

Main

 Charlie Adler as SAVO, Chimpanzee (ep. 1), Police Officer (ep. 2), Kid (ep. 3), Gopher Dad (ep. 4), Frinja #3 (ep. 6), Worker #1 (ep. 6), Record Executive (ep. 8), Herbert Dinkwell (ep. 10)
 Grey DeLisle as Kitty, Penguin (ep. 1), Lil (ep. 1), Kate (ep. 2), Child (ep. 3), Kwan (ep. 3), Mom (ep. 3), Fabiola (ep. 4, 15), Badger Kid (ep. 5), Jack (ep. 6), Mrs. Hopper (ep. 7), Mateo (ep. 8), Bobby (ep. 9), Queen of England (ep. 10), Jackie (ep. 11), Jodie (ep. 14), Teacher (ep. 14)
 Mark Hamill as Burt, Lobster Theodore (ep. 1), Carl the Electrical Worker (ep. 3), Driver (ep. 5), Mayor of Digger's Gold (ep. 9), Butler (ep. 10)
 Jerry Houser as Sully, Police Officer (ep. 3), Audience Guy #1 (ep. 5), Decibull #3 (ep. 8), Dad (ep. 8), Paramedic (ep. 10)
 John Kassir as Fallbot, Peter Possum (ep. 1), Fox Dad (ep. 4), Eddie (ep. 5), Frinja #2 (ep. 6), Decibull #2 (ep. 8), Police Officer (ep. 8), Giles (ep. 9), Fire Chief (ep. 10), Beaver Guy (ep. 11), Duncan (ep. 14), Kid #1 (ep. 14)
 Rob Paulsen as Squeeky, Snarf (ep. 2), Quentin V. Manderbill (ep. 3), Firework Announcer (ep. 4), Sparky's Dad (ep. 5), Frinja #1 (ep. 6), Billy Goat (ep. 7), Mr. Curl (ep. 7), Decibull #1 (ep. 8), Inspector Brumell (ep. 10), Mr. Buckster (ep. 11), Luke (ep. 12), Ship Crew Member (ep. 13), Chancy McSpill (ep. 14), Scott (ep. 15)
 Kevin Michael Richardson as Burble, Chili Dog (ep. 2), Judge Maxim (ep. 4), Audience Guy #2 (ep. 5), Frinja #4 (ep. 6), Knuckles (ep. 8), Detective (ep. 10), Lonnie (ep. 10), Announcer (ep. 14)
 Tasia Valenza as Gabriela the Hummingbird, London Reporter (ep. 1), Raccoon Kid #2 (ep. 1), Firefighter #3 (ep. 4), Ana Gomez (ep. 14)

Additional
 Pamela Adlon as Carl (ep. 8), Martin (ep. 8)
 Jeff Bennett as Henri Ennui (ep. 6), EMT (ep. 6), Factory Owner (ep. 6)
 Gregg Berger as Commander Octodon (ep. 1)
 Cassie Boyd as Talya Mendoza (ep. 14), Kid #2 (ep. 14), Kid #3 (ep. 14)
 Kimberly Brooks as Boy (ep. 3), Girl #2 (ep. 3)
 Jodi Carlisle as Mother (ep. 8), Teacher (ep. 8)
 Justin Cowden as Derek (ep. 4, 15), Dad (ep. 4, 15), Gopher Kid (ep. 4)
 Elizabeth Daily as Bobby (ep. 5), Kid (ep. 5), Sparky (ep. 5)
 Debi Derryberry as Emily (ep. 10), Mark (ep. 10), Royal Secretary (ep. 10)
 Jessica DiCicco as Manny (ep. 6), Moe (ep. 6)
 Nika Futterman as Sheila the Cancun Reporter (ep. 1), Harry (ep. 1), Raccoon Kid #1 (ep. 1)
 Kim Mai Guest as Angela (ep. 3), Girl #1 (ep. 3)
 Jess Harnell as Captain Squall (ep. 13), Chival Brayski (ep. 13), Cruise Director (ep. 13)
 Jonathan Harris as S.A.V.O. (ep. 7)
 Amber Hood as Andy (ep. 5), Boy (ep. 5), Pauley (ep. 5)
 Richard Steven Horvitz as Worley the Weasel (ep. 5), Beaver (ep. 5)
 Joe Lala as Hector Delgado (ep. 1), Joey Clams (ep. 1), Raccoon Dad (ep. 1)
 Carolyn Lawrence as Ana (ep. 15), Millie (ep. 15)
 Katie Leigh as Adam (ep. 15)
 Sherry Lynn as Casey (ep. 4), Panda Girl (ep. 4), Panda Mom (ep. 4), Kelly Lamb (ep. 7), Mrs. Curl (ep. 7), Raccoon Kid (ep. 7), Casey (ep. 15), Kareen (ep. 15)
 Danny Mann as Dudek Brayski (ep. 13), Fran-Teek Brayski (ep. 13)
 Jason Marsden as Alex (ep. 1, pilot), Rusty Ringtail (ep. 2), Jack, Kevin, and Matt (ep. 3), Lucky Curl (ep. 1, pilot)
 Annie Mumolo as Jose (ep. 9)
 Liza del Mundo as Billy (ep. 5), Police Officer (ep. 5), Wendy (ep. 5)
 David Prince as Fire Chief Daniels (ep. 4), Tall Tale Tim (ep. 9), Fire Ranger (ep. 9)
 Michael Reisz as Scott (ep. 4), Panda Dad (ep. 4)
 Marilyn Rising as Kids (ep. 9)
 Crystal Scales as Danny (ep. 10), Harrison (ep. 10)
 Justin Shenkarow as Jenkins (ep. 10), Nick (ep. 10)
 Kath Soucie as Mrs. Martha Barkster (ep. 12), Amy (ep. 12), Antny (ep. 12)
 Andre Stojka as Mr. Barkster (ep. 12)
 Danny Strong as Casey (ep. 9), Mickey (ep. 9)
 Tara Strong as Juan (ep. 2), Timmy (ep. 2)
 Cree Summer as Alisha (ep. 13), Alisha's Mom (ep. 13)
 Philip Tanzini as Brutus (ep. 5), Joey (ep. 5)
 Rosslyn Taylor as Willie Buckster (ep. 11), Cookie (ep. 11)
 Mark Thompson as Monster Truck Rally Announcer (ep. 5)
 Lauren Tom as Firefighter #2 (ep. 4), Miko (ep. 4), Poodle Kid (ep. 4)
 Kari Wahlgren as Alice Buckster (ep. 11), Mrs. Buckster (ep. 11)
 Audrey Wasilewski as Julie (ep. 9), Kareen (ep. 9), Denny (ep. 12), Dex (ep. 12)
 Frank Welker as Mr. Sherman (ep. 11), Rufio (ep. 11), Sparky the Robot Dog (ep. 11)

Episodes

Books
 Street Smarts
 Poison Patrol
 Blazin' Hot
 Cool By The Pool
 Free Wheelin'
 Danger Alert
 Attack of the Achoos
 Camping Caper
 Adventure Island

Production
Douglas Smith and Michael Moore hired ProMedia of Knoxville TN to develop a low fidelity prototype that was used to conceptualize the aspirational goal of the animation.  Chris West an employee of ProMedia was a valued contributing member of their team and was instrumental in developing the original prototype.  After raising the necessary capital to produce the pilot episode "Mission 547" Smith and Moore traveled to Los Angeles where Jerry Houser, Larry Huber, Ginny McSwain, Howard Kazanjian and Ilie Agopian brought the pilot to life.

The first Hollywood production was completed in 2003. The show was created from the cause of children's safety and was the first show to successfully put Disney-quality productions into a quality curriculum. Danger Rangers was the most successfully distributed independent show on PBS affiliates and was documented to have saved lives.

Broadcast
The series originally aired on PBS Kids under the American Public Television brand from 2005 to 2006. Reruns aired on CBS as part of Cookie Jar TV from September 2011 to September 2012, but was edited for commercial television purposes, which included having the epilogue of the episode cut, resulting in showing only 14 out of 16 episodes on that network.

Business dealings
Educational Adventures (the original company behind the show) built distribution through grassroots efforts and deals with Virgin Atlantic and Safe Kids Worldwide. The assets of the company were eventually lost in a lawsuit after the liquidation of the company. This left Mike D. Moore to seek to regain control and restart the show.

References

External links
 

2000s American animated television series
2005 American television series debuts
2006 American television series endings
American children's animated action television series
American children's animated adventure television series
American children's animated education television series
American children's animated fantasy television series
American children's animated musical television series
American children's animated superhero television series
English-language television shows
CBS original programming
PBS original programming
PBS Kids shows
Animated television series about bears
Fictional polar bears
Animated television series about birds
Animated television series about cats
Animated television series about mice and rats
Fictional pinnipeds
Animated television series about turtles
Animated television series about robots
Television series by Cookie Jar Entertainment
Television series by DHX Media